Lepaca Kliffoth is the fourth full-length studio release by Swedish symphonic metal band Therion. The title refers to the Qliphoth. Stylistically, it retains the aggressive riffing and sheds the harsh growls of the band's previous death metal output, while also incorporating more elements of traditional heavy metal and more pronounced gothic and symphonic elements, often leading to this album being viewed as a transitional album in Therion's discography.

Reception 
For Metal Storm, the album "stands between the band's more Death roots and later symphonic grandiosity" and "turns out to be a fine piece of work, the great songwriting, mixed with Arabic-influenced keyboards is remarkable, and those mysterious lyrics just add more charm".

Deathmetal.org states that Lepaca Kliffoth "should be avoided by the serious listener" because the structural genius of earlier Therion albums is here only available as distracting ornamentation, rendering it "very cheesy radio hard rock".

Track listing
Lyrics and Music by Christofer Johnsson, except where stated.

"Enter the Voids" was previously released before only on the original LP version of "Lepaca Kliffoth"
The first release of digipack from November 15, 1996, has a black tray and missing #8 track "Sorrows of the Moon" on the back cover. The second release (ca. 1999) has a clear tray, fixed track listing, and additional pictures on the inside cover.

Credits
Christofer Johnsson - guitar, vocals and keyboards
Piotr Wawrzeniuk - drums
Fredrik Isaksson - bass guitar
Harris Johns - engineering, mixing (except "Darkness Eve")

Guest musicians
Hans Groning - bass-baritone vocals ("The Beauty in Black", "Evocation of Vovin")
Claudia Maria Mokri - soprano vocals ("The Beauty in Black", "Evocation of Vovin", "Black")
Harris Johns - lead guitar (first part of solo in "The Beauty in Black")
"Jan" - additional vocals (chorus parts of "Wings of the Hydra", "Sorrows of the Moon")

Single
 "The Beauty in Black"

Cover

Qliphoth

Album's inlay contains eleven pointed star, hendecagram, which is the symbol strictly related with the band. Every triangle and space between include Qliphoth's name (see image on the right). The list contains following names:
Lilith
Naamah
Thaumiel
Satan
Moloch
Ghagiel
Beelzebub
Satariel
Lucifuge
Gha'agsheblah
Golachab
Asmodeus
Thagirion
Belfegor
A'arab Zaraq
Baal
Samael
Adramelek
Gamariel
Astaroth

Names mentioned in triangles came from the Dragon Rouge's Draconian initiation.

Credits
Album cover and design made by Holmen & Ungman Productions. 
Original painting by Kristian Wåhlin. 
Tom Eriksen is an album's art director. He is also responsible for cover's computer treatments.

References

External links
 
  (Japanese edition)
  (digipack re-release)
 
  (digipack re-release)
 Information about album at the official website

1995 albums
Therion (band) albums
Nuclear Blast albums
Megarock Records albums
Albums with cover art by Kristian Wåhlin